Ein Kerem Agricultural School (Beit HaSefer HaHakla'i Ein Kerem), also known as Ein Kerem Community Environmental School (Beit HaSefer HaKehilati Svivati Ein Kerem) is a school in central Israel. Located near Ein Kerem, it falls under the jurisdiction of Mateh Yehuda Regional Council.

History
Ein Kerem school opened in 1948, after a farm school established in 1933 in East Talpiot by Rachel Yanait Ben-Zvi (later wife of President Yitzhak Ben-Zvi) moved to abandoned buildings in Ein Kerem.

Aharon Appelfeld, who went on to become of one of Israel's leading authors, attended the Ein Kerem Agricultural School. He writes about the school in his memoirs:

Today, Ein Kerem Agricultural School is a regional high school for localities in the Matte Yehuda Regional Council area. It offers classes in horticulture, nutrition, treatment of potted plants, geology, environmental studies, theater, Arabic and  biology in addition to the regular curriculum.

References

External links
School website 

Villages in Israel
Agriculture in Israel
Education in Israel
Populated places established in 1948
Populated places in Jerusalem District
1948 establishments in Israel